The Heart and Stroke Foundation of Canada is a Canadian charity dedicated to advocacy, education, and the funding of research surrounding heart disease and stroke.

Nomenclature 
In November 2016, the organization re-branded as Heart & Stroke and introduced a new logo; the new branding is meant to signify a more "personal" approach to its marketing, with a wider targeting of younger demographics and immigrants.

Activities 
Heart and Stroke works with medical doctors and healthcare institutions to reduce mortality from cardiovascular events. Key institutional stakeholders include provincial ministries of health, hospital associations, and healthcare institutes. They have collaborated with the Canadian Stoke Society and the Health Canada Laboratory Centre for Disease Control to create the Stroke System Coalition.

Heart and Stroke fund and take part in research and fund publications of research that addresses the way in which women and other demographic groups are particularly affected by cardiovascular incidents.

Publications 
In early February 2018, the organization released Ms Understood, a report about how women's early warning signs of a heart attack are frequently missed.

Fundraising 

Heart and Stroke operates a number of fundraising events, including the Bike Bike event in which 29 riders power one big red bike for twenty minutes. Jump Rope for Heart elementary school based fundraising initiative involving physical activities based around skipping Jump Rope for Heart celebrated its 35th anniversary in 2017, with close to 4,000 schools participating across Canada. Heart and Stroke's Ride for Heart is an annual summer running and cycling event based in Toronto, Ontario, taking place on part of the Gardiner Expressway and Don Valley Parkway, both of which are closed for the event. In 2017, Ride for Heart celebrated its 30th anniversary with 15,000 riders and 5,000 runners and walkers. Its title sponsor is Manulife Financial. In 2018, Toronto city councilor Stephen Holyday requested that the event be moved to inner city streets rather than Gardiner Expressway, to ease traffic congestion. Proceeds from Heart & Stroke's annual lottery goes toward supporting grants for research at teaching hospitals and universities across the province of Ontario.

References

External links
 

Health charities in Canada
Medical and health organizations based in Ontario
Heart disease organizations
Stroke organizations
Organizations based in Ottawa
Organizations established in 1952
1952 establishments in Canada